Dyukovskaya is a rural locality (a village) in Velsk, Velsky District, Arkhangelsk Oblast, Russia. The population was 198 as of 2010. There are 2 streets.

Geography 
Dyukovskaya is located 2 km north of Velsk (the district's administrative centre) by road. Velsk is the nearest rural locality.

References 

Rural localities in Velsky District